Pedro Salvatori (22 November 1933 – 24 March 2017) was an Argentine politician and member of the Neuquén People's Movement, a regional party based in his home Neuquén Province. He served as the Governor of Neuquén Province from 1987 to 1991, as well as the de facto Governor of Neuquén briefly from 1972 to 1973 during the military rule.

Salvatori died of respiratory failure at the Policlínico Neuquen hospital in the city of Neuquén on 24 March 2017, at the age of 83. His death was announced on Twitter by the current Governor of Neuquén Province, Omar Gutiérrez, who declared two days of official mourning. He was buried in the Central Cemetery in Neuquén.

References

1933 births
2017 deaths
Governors of Neuquén Province
Members of the Argentine Chamber of Deputies elected in Neuquén
Members of the Argentine Senate for Neuquén
Neuquén People's Movement politicians
Argentine people of Italian descent